Joanne Blyton (born December 7, 1947) is a Republican member of the Montana Legislature.  She was elected to House District 59 which represents the Carbon County area.

References

Living people
1947 births
Republican Party members of the Montana House of Representatives
People from Carbon County, Montana